Lepidoscia is a genus of bagworm moths in the family Psychidae. There are more than 40 described species in Lepidoscia, found primarily in Australia and New Zealand.

Species
These 42 species belong to the genus Lepidoscia:

 Lepidoscia amphiscia Meyrick, 1893
 Lepidoscia annosella
 Lepidoscia arctiella Walker, 1869
 Lepidoscia barysema Lower, 1903
 Lepidoscia carlotta
 Lepidoscia cataphracta
 Lepidoscia characota
 Lepidoscia chloropetala Meyrick, 1893
 Lepidoscia chrysastra Turner, 1923
 Lepidoscia confluens
 Lepidoscia desmophthora Meyrick, 1893
 Lepidoscia dicranota
 Lepidoscia euriptola Lower, 1903
 Lepidoscia euryptera
 Lepidoscia glabrella
 Lepidoscia globigera Meyrick, 1911
 Lepidoscia heliochares
 Lepidoscia herbicola Meyrick, 1921
 Lepidoscia lainodes Meyrick, 1921
 Lepidoscia ligatus Walker, 1865
 Lepidoscia magnella Walker, 1863
 Lepidoscia magnifica Meyrick, 1893
 Lepidoscia melanogramma Lower, 1903
 Lepidoscia melitora Meyrick, 1893
 Lepidoscia microsticha Meyrick, 1893
 Lepidoscia monosticha Turner, 1923
 Lepidoscia monozona Meyrick, 1893
 Lepidoscia muricolor Turner, 1939
 Lepidoscia niphopasta Turner, 1923
 Lepidoscia palleuca Meyrick, 1893
 Lepidoscia placoxantha Lower, 1903
 Lepidoscia polychrysa Lower, 1903
 Lepidoscia protorna
 Lepidoscia punctiferella Walker, 1863
 Lepidoscia raricoma Meyrick, 1893
 Lepidoscia sciodesma Meyrick, 1893
 Lepidoscia stenomochla
 Lepidoscia strigulata Meyrick, 1893
 Lepidoscia tetramochla
 Lepidoscia tetraphragma Meyrick, 1921
 Lepidoscia trileuca Lower, 1903
 Lepidoscia tyrobathra Meyrick, 1893

References

Further reading

External links

 

Psychidae
Psychidae genera